Abelardo Olivier (9 November 1877 – 24 January 1951) was an Italian fencer. He won a silver medal at the 1908 Summer Olympics and two golds at the 1920 Summer Olympics.

References

External links
 
 

1877 births
1951 deaths
Italian male épée fencers
Olympic fencers of Italy
Fencers at the 1908 Summer Olympics
Fencers at the 1920 Summer Olympics
Olympic gold medalists for Italy
Olympic silver medalists for Italy
Olympic medalists in fencing
Medalists at the 1908 Summer Olympics
Medalists at the 1920 Summer Olympics
Italian male foil fencers
Italian male sabre fencers